Shottermill & Haslemere Football Club is a football club based in Haslemere, Surrey, England.

History  
The club was established in 2001 as a merger of Shottermill and Haslemere. The new club initially played in the Surrey County Senior League, taking over from Shottermills league position. They joined the Combined Counties League when it formed a new Division One in 2003. In 2006 they left the CCL and dropped into the Premier Division of the Surrey County Intermediate League (Western).
 
Their first season in the Surrey County Intermediate League (Western), saw the club get to the final of the Surrey County Intermediate Cup, losing 2–0 to Epsom Eagles Senior.

In 2011–12, Shottermill and Haslemere finished fourth in Surrey County Intermediate League (Western) Premier, and reached the League Cup final losing 3–1 to Worplesdon Phoenix.

Ground

Shottermill & Haslemere play their home games at Haslemere Recreational Ground, Scotland Lane, GU27 3AN.

Staff
Club Chairman – Tim Howard
Club Secretary – Tim Howard
Club Treasurer – Andrew Burdett
Social Media Secretary(s) – Jozef Cole
1st Team Manager(s) – Terry Tallyeux-Rowden & Jake Kennett
2nd Team Manager – Alex Long

Honours

League honours
Surrey County Intermediate League (Western) Premier Division:
 Runners-Up (1): 2012–13

Surrey Intermediate League

Champions: 1947-48 as Haslemere and Shottermill, 1954-55 as Shottermill, 1960-61 as Haslemere, 1971-72 as Shottermill

Division One

Champions: 1983-84 as Haslemere, 1993-94 as Shottermill, 1995-96 as Haslemere, 1996-97 as Haslemere

Cup honours
Surrey County Intermediate Cup:
 Runners-Up (1): 2006–07
Surrey County Intermediate League (Western) Premier Challenge Cup:
 Runners-Up (1): 2011–12

Records
Highest League Position: 14th, Combined Counties League Division One 2003–04

References

External links
Club website

Association football clubs established in 2001
Combined Counties Football League
Football clubs in Surrey
2001 establishments in England
Football clubs in England
Surrey County Intermediate League (Western)
Haslemere